Eydehavn or Eydehamn is a village in the municipality of Arendal in Agder county, Norway. The village is named after Sam Eyde, the Norwegian engineer and industrialist. The local sports team is called IL Sørfjell and have teen teams in a variety of sports. Eydehavn has about 1,100 residents as of 2015.

History
Eydehavn grew up around a smelting factory and an aluminium factory starting around 1912. The village became quite the industrial hub for the area. In 1919, when a new municipality; Stokken was created, the village of Eydehavn was chosen to be the administrative centre. In 1962, Stokken municipality was merged with some other areas and together they formed the new municipality of Moland. Eydehavn was chosen to be the administrative centre of Moland. In 1992, Moland was incorporated into the municipality of Arendal.

References

External links

Villages in Agder
Arendal